Johann "Hans" Krankl (born 14 February 1953) is a retired Austrian footballer. A prolific striker, Krankl is regarded by many as one of Austria's greatest players.

Club career

Krankl started his professional career at Rapid Wien and stayed there for 8 years, apart from a year at Wiener AC. He won the European Golden Boot at Rapid Wien in 1978, attracting the interest of Barcelona. His spell at Barcelona was successful, winning the Cup Winners' Cup (scoring in the final itself), and picking up the top goalscorer's award in La Liga that season with 29 goals. He returned to Rapid Wien in 1981, captaining the side and again scoring over 100 goals for them over the next 5 years. He played a major part in the most successful of Rapid teams in the 1980s, claiming the League crown twice, in 1982 and 1983, and three consecutive Austrian cup titles. He scored Rapid's only goal in the 3–1 loss in the Cup Winners' Cup Final in 1985 against Everton. In 1986, he moved to become player-manager at Wiener Sport-Club.

Krankl was named Austrian Player of the Year a record five times, and was voted the most popular Austrian player of the last 25 years.

International career
Krankl made his debut for Austria in a June 1973 friendly match against Brazil and was a participant at the 1978 and 1982 World Cups. He earned 69 caps, scoring 34 goals. His final international game was an April 1985 World Cup qualification match against Hungary. In the 1978–79 season of the Spanish Primera División, he was the top goalscorer with 29 goals for Barcelona and was awarded the Pichichi Trophy.

In a match against Malta in 1977, Krankl scored six goals as Austria ran out 9–0 winners.

One of his major achievements was helping Austria qualify for the 1978 World Cup, the first time Austria had qualified for the World Cup in twenty years. He then went on to score the winning goal against West Germany in a game dubbed The miracle of Córdoba, which the Austrians won 3–2 and which was Austria's first win against West Germany in 47 years, earning Krankl legendary status in his homeland. Scored in the 88th minute, the live footage of the goal still regularly features on national television, and the audio commentary ("Tor Tor Tor Tor Tor Tor, I werd' narrisch" – "Goal goal goal goal goal goal, I'm going crazy") is immediately recognised by Austrian football fans.

Managerial career
Since ending his playing career at Austria Salzburg in 1989, Krankl has worked as a football manager and coach. He was employed by the Austrian national team. He was sacked on 28 September 2005 after Austria failed to qualify for the 2006 World Cup. He was also manager of LASK Linz.

He has also intermittently featured as a studio guest and co–commentator on Austrian public service broadcaster ORF.

Musical career
Krankl has also enjoyed domestic success with his music, with several releases entering the Austrian charts. His biggest musical success was the single "Lonely Boy", released in 1985 and peaking at number 2.

Appearances
Krankl has also appeared on EA Sports FIFA sports games, as he is included as an unlockable in the Classic XI Team.

Career statistics

Club

International
Scores and results list Austria's goal tally first.

Honours

Club
Rapid Wien
Austrian Football Bundesliga: 1981–82, 1982–83
Austrian Cup: 1975–76, 1982–83, 1983–84, 1984–85

Barcelona
Copa del Rey: 1980–81
UEFA Cup Winners' Cup: 1978–79

Individual
Ballon d'Or Silver Ball: 1978
IOC European Footballer of the Season: 1978–79
Austrian Player of the Year: 1973, 1974, 1977, 1982, 1988
Austrian Bundesliga Top Goalscorer: 1973–74, 1976–77, 1977–78, 1982–83
Pichichi Trophy: 1978–79
European Golden Shoe: 1978
Austrian Manager of the Year: 1999

See also 
 List of men's footballers with 500 or more goals

References 

 Connelly, Charlie (2002) Stamping Grounds: Exploring Liechtenstein and Its World Cup Dreams. Abacus.

External links

 Bio and factfile – The FA
 
 Rapid stats – Rapid Archive
 

1953 births
Living people
Footballers from Vienna
Austrian footballers
Austria international footballers
1978 FIFA World Cup players
1982 FIFA World Cup players
SK Rapid Wien players
FC Barcelona players
First Vienna FC players
FC Red Bull Salzburg players
Austrian Football Bundesliga players
Austrian expatriate footballers
La Liga players
Expatriate footballers in Spain
Austrian football managers
SK Rapid Wien managers
FC Tirol Innsbruck managers
FC Red Bull Salzburg managers
FC Admira Wacker Mödling managers
Austria national football team managers
LASK managers
Pichichi Trophy winners
Austrian expatriate football managers
SC Fortuna Köln managers
Austrian expatriate sportspeople in Spain
Association football forwards